Rohu is a village in Vinni Parish, Lääne-Viru County, in northeastern Estonia. It's located about 5 km northwest of Laekvere and about 7 km northeast of Simuna. It has a population of 55 (as of 3 January 2011).

Estonia's most famous sumo wrestler Baruto Kaito grew up in Rohu village.

References

Villages in Lääne-Viru County